Sir Alfred Jules "Freddie" Ayer  (29 October 1910 – 27 June 1989), usually cited as A. J. Ayer, was an English philosopher known for his promotion of logical positivism, particularly in his books Language, Truth, and Logic (1936) and The Problem of Knowledge (1956).

Ayer was educated at Eton College and the University of Oxford, after which he studied the philosophy of logical positivism at the University of Vienna. From 1933 to 1940 he lectured on philosophy at Christ Church, Oxford.

During the Second World War Ayer was a Special Operations Executive and MI6 agent.

Ayer was Grote Professor of the Philosophy of Mind and Logic at University College London from 1946 until 1959, after which he returned to Oxford to become Wykeham Professor of Logic at New College. He was president of the Aristotelian Society from 1951 to 1952 and knighted in 1970. He was known for his advocacy of humanism, and was the second president of the British Humanist Association (now known as Humanists UK).

Ayer was president of the Homosexual Law Reform Society for a time; he remarked, "as a notorious heterosexual I could never be accused of feathering my own nest."

Life 
Ayer was born in St John's Wood, in north west London, to Jules Louis Cyprien Ayer and Reine (née Citroen), wealthy parents from continental Europe. His mother was from the Dutch-Jewish family that founded the Citroën car company in France; his father was a Swiss Calvinist financier who worked for the Rothschild family, including for their bank and as secretary to Alfred Rothschild.

Ayer was educated at Ascham St Vincent's School, a former boarding preparatory school for boys in the seaside town of Eastbourne in Sussex, where he started boarding at the relatively early age of seven for reasons to do with the First World War, and at Eton College, where he was a King's Scholar. At Eton Ayer first became known for his characteristic bravado and precocity. Though primarily interested in his intellectual pursuits, he was very keen on sports, particularly rugby, and reputedly played the Eton Wall Game very well. In the final examinations at Eton, Ayer came second in his year, and first in classics. In his final year, as a member of Eton's senior council, he unsuccessfully campaigned for the abolition of corporal punishment at the school. He won a classics scholarship to Christ Church, Oxford. He graduated with a BA with first-class honours.

After graduating from Oxford, Ayer spent a year in Vienna, returned to England and published his first book, Language, Truth and Logic, in 1936. The first exposition in English of logical positivism as newly developed by the Vienna Circle, this made Ayer at age 26 the enfant terrible of British philosophy. As a newly famous intellectual, he played a prominent role in the Oxford by-election campaign of 1938. Ayer campaigned first for the Labour candidate Patrick Gordon Walker, and then for the joint Labour-Liberal "Independent Progressive" candidate Sandie Lindsay, who ran on an anti-appeasement platform against the Conservative candidate, Quintin Hogg, who ran as the appeasement candidate. The by-election, held on 27 October 1938, was quite close, with Hogg winning narrowly.  

In the Second World War, Ayer served as an officer in the Welsh Guards, chiefly in intelligence (Special Operations Executive (SOE) and MI6). He was commissioned second lieutenant into the Welsh Guards from Officer Cadet Training Unit on 21 September 1940.

After the war, Ayer briefly returned to the University of Oxford where he became a fellow and Dean of Wadham College. He then taught philosophy at London University from 1946 until 1959, when he also started to appear on radio and television. He was an extrovert and social mixer who liked dancing and attending clubs in London and New York. He was also obsessed with sport: he had played rugby for Eton, and was a noted cricketer and a keen supporter of Tottenham Hotspur football team, where he was for many years a season ticket holder. For an academic, Ayer was an unusually well-connected figure in his time, with close links to 'high society' and the establishment. Presiding over Oxford high-tables, he is often described as charming, but could also be intimidating.

Ayer was married four times to three women. His first marriage was from 1932 to 1941, to (Grace Isabel) Renée, with whom he had a son—allegedly in fact the son of Ayer's friend and colleague Stuart Hampshire—and a daughter. Renée subsequently married Hampshire. In 1960, Ayer married Alberta Constance (Dee) Wells, with whom he had one son. That marriage was dissolved in 1983, and the same year, Ayer married Vanessa Salmon, the former wife of politician Nigel Lawson. She died in 1985, and in 1989 Ayer remarried Wells, who survived him. He also had a daughter with Hollywood columnist Sheilah Graham Westbrook.
 
In 1950, Ayer attended the founding meeting of the Congress for Cultural Freedom in West Berlin, though he later said he went only because of the offer of a "free trip". He gave a speech on why John Stuart Mill's conceptions of liberty and freedom were still valid in the 20th century. Together with the historian Hugh Trevor-Roper, Ayer fought against Arthur Koestler and Franz Borkenau, arguing that they were far too dogmatic and extreme in their anti-communism, in fact proposing illiberal measures in the defense of liberty. Adding to the tension was the location in West Berlin, together with the fact that the Korean War began on 25 June 1950, the fourth day of the congress, giving a feeling that the world was on the brink of war.   

From 1959 to his retirement in 1978, Ayer held the Wykeham Chair, Professor of Logic at Oxford. He was knighted in 1970. After his retirement, Ayer taught or lectured several times in the United States, including as a visiting professor at Bard College in 1987. At a party that same year held by fashion designer Fernando Sanchez, Ayer confronted Mike Tyson, who was forcing himself upon the then little-known model Naomi Campbell. When Ayer demanded that Tyson stop, Tyson reportedly asked, "Do you know who the fuck I am? I'm the heavyweight champion of the world", to which Ayer replied, "And I am the former Wykeham Professor of Logic. We are both preeminent in our field. I suggest that we talk about this like rational men". Ayer and Tyson then began to talk, allowing Campbell to slip out. Ayer was also involved in politics, including anti-Vietnam War activism, supporting the Labour Party (and later the Social Democratic Party), chairing the Campaign Against Racial Discrimination in Sport, and serving as president of the Homosexual Law Reform Society.

In 1988, a year before his death, Ayer wrote an article titled "What I saw when I was dead", describing an unusual near-death experience. Of the experience, he first said that it "slightly weakened my conviction that my genuine death ... will be the end of me, though I continue to hope that it will be." A few weeks later, he revised this, saying, "what I should have said is that my experiences have weakened, not my belief that there is no life after death, but my inflexible attitude towards that belief".

Ayer died on 27 June 1989. From 1980 to 1989 he lived at 51 York Street, Marylebone, where a memorial plaque was unveiled on 19 November 1995.

Philosophical ideas 
In Language, Truth and Logic (1936), Ayer presents the verification principle as the only valid basis for philosophy. Unless logical or empirical verification is possible, statements like "God exists" or "charity is good" are not true or untrue but meaningless, and may thus be excluded or ignored. Religious language in particular is unverifiable and as such literally nonsense. He also criticises C. A. Mace's opinion that metaphysics is a form of intellectual poetry. The stance that a belief in God denotes no verifiable hypothesis is sometimes referred to as igtheism (for example, by Paul Kurtz). In later years, Ayer reiterated that he did not believe in God and began to call himself an atheist. He followed in the footsteps of Bertrand Russell by debating religion with the Jesuit scholar Frederick Copleston.

Ayer's version of emotivism divides "the ordinary system of ethics" into four classes:
"Propositions that express definitions of ethical terms, or judgements about the legitimacy or possibility of certain definitions"
"Propositions describing the phenomena of moral experience, and their causes"
"Exhortations to moral virtue"
"Actual ethical judgments"
He focuses on propositions of the first class—moral judgments—saying that those of the second class belong to science, those of the third are mere commands, and those of the fourth (which are considered normative ethics as opposed to meta-ethics) are too concrete for ethical philosophy.

Ayer argues that moral judgments cannot be translated into non-ethical, empirical terms and thus cannot be verified; in this he agrees with ethical intuitionists. But he differs from intuitionists by discarding appeals to intuition of non-empirical moral truths as "worthless" since the intuition of one person often contradicts that of another. Instead, Ayer concludes that ethical concepts are "mere pseudo-concepts":

Between 1945 and 1947, together with Russell and George Orwell, Ayer contributed a series of articles to Polemic, a short-lived British "Magazine of Philosophy, Psychology, and Aesthetics" edited by the ex-Communist Humphrey Slater.

Ayer was closely associated with the British humanist movement. He was an Honorary Associate of the Rationalist Press Association from 1947 until his death. He was elected a Foreign Honorary Member of the American Academy of Arts and Sciences in 1963. In 1965, he became the first president of the Agnostics' Adoption Society and in the same year succeeded Julian Huxley as president of the British Humanist Association, a post he held until 1970. In 1968 he edited The Humanist Outlook, a collection of essays on the meaning of humanism. He was one of the signers of the Humanist Manifesto.

Works 
Ayer is best known for popularising the verification principle, in particular through his presentation of it in Language, Truth, and Logic. The principle was at the time at the heart of the debates of the so-called Vienna Circle, which Ayer had visited as a young guest. Others, including the circle's leading light, Moritz Schlick, were already writing papers on the issue. Ayer's formulation was that a sentence can be meaningful only if it has verifiable empirical import; otherwise, it is either "analytical" if tautologous or "metaphysical" (i.e. meaningless, or "literally senseless"). He started to work on the book at the age of 23 and it was published when he was 26. Ayer's philosophical ideas were deeply influenced by those of the Vienna Circle and David Hume. His clear, vibrant and polemical exposition of them makes Language, Truth and Logic essential reading on the tenets of logical empiricism; the book is regarded as a classic of 20th-century analytic philosophy and is widely read in philosophy courses around the world. In it, Ayer also proposes that the distinction between a conscious man and an unconscious machine resolves itself into a distinction between "different types of perceptible behaviour", an argument that anticipates the Turing test published in 1950 to test a machine's capability to demonstrate intelligence.

Ayer wrote two books on the philosopher Bertrand Russell, Russell and Moore: The Analytic Heritage (1971) and Russell (1972). He also wrote an introductory book on the philosophy of David Hume and a short biography of Voltaire.

Ayer was a strong critic of the German philosopher Martin Heidegger. As a logical positivist, Ayer was in conflict with Heidegger's vast, overarching theories of existence. Ayer considered them completely unverifiable through empirical demonstration and logical analysis, and this sort of philosophy an unfortunate strain in modern thought. He considered Heidegger the worst example of such philosophy, which Ayer believed entirely useless. In Philosophy in the Twentieth Century, Ayer accuses Heidegger of "surprising ignorance" or "unscrupulous distortion" and "what can fairly be described as charlatanism."

In 1972–73, Ayer gave the Gifford Lectures at the University of St Andrews, later published as The Central Questions of Philosophy. In the book's preface, he defends his selection to hold the lectureship on the basis that Lord Gifford wished to promote "natural theology, in the widest sense of that term", and that non-believers are allowed to give the lectures if they are "able reverent men, true thinkers, sincere lovers of and earnest inquirers after truth". He still believed in the viewpoint he shared with the logical positivists: that large parts of what was traditionally called philosophyincluding metaphysics, theology and aestheticswere not matters that could be judged true or false, and that it was thus meaningless to discuss them.

In The Concept of a Person and Other Essays (1963), Ayer heavily criticized Wittgenstein's private language argument.

Ayer's sense-data theory in Foundations of Empirical Knowledge was famously criticised by fellow Oxonian J. L. Austin in Sense and Sensibilia, a landmark 1950s work of common language philosophy. Ayer responded in the essay "Has Austin Refuted the Sense-datum Theory?", which can be found in his Metaphysics and Common Sense (1969).

Awards 
Ayer was awarded a Knighthood as Knight Bachelor in the London Gazette on 1 January 1970.

Selected publications 
 1936, Language, Truth, and Logic, London: Gollancz., 2nd ed., with new introduction (1946)   
 1936, "Causation and free will," The Aryan Path.
 1940, The Foundations of Empirical Knowledge, London: Macmillan. 
 1954, Philosophical Essays, London: Macmillan. (Essays on freedom, phenomenalism, basic propositions, utilitarianism, other minds, the past, ontology.) 
 1957, "The conception of probability as a logical relation", in S. Korner, ed., Observation and Interpretation in the Philosophy of Physics, New York, N.Y.: Dover Publications.
 1956, The Problem of Knowledge, London: Macmillan. 
1957, "Logical Positivism - A Debate"  (with F. C. Copleston) in: Edwards, Paul, Pap, Arthur (eds.), A Modern Introduction to Philosophy; readings from classical and contemporary sources
 1963, The Concept of a Person and Other Essays, London: Macmillan. (Essays on truth, privacy and private languages, laws of nature, the concept of a person, probability.) 
 1967, "Has Austin Refuted the Sense-Datum Theory?" Synthese vol. XVIII, pp. 117–140. (Reprinted in Ayer 1969).
 1968, The Origins of Pragmatism, London: Macmillan. 
 1969, Metaphysics and Common Sense, London: Macmillan. (Essays on knowledge, man as a subject for science, chance, philosophy and politics, existentialism, metaphysics, and a reply to Austin on sense-data theory [Ayer 1967].) 
 1971, Russell and Moore: The Analytical Heritage, London: Macmillan. 
 1972, Probability and Evidence, London: Macmillan. 
 1972, Russell, London: Fontana Modern Masters. 
 1973, The Central Questions of Philosophy, London: Weidenfeld. 
 1977, Part of My Life, London: Collins. 
 1979, "Replies", in G. F. Macdonald, ed., Perception and Identity: Essays Presented to A. J. Ayer, With His Replies, London: Macmillan; Ithaca, N.Y.: Cornell University Press.
 1980, Hume, Oxford: Oxford University Press
 1982, Philosophy in the Twentieth Century, London: Weidenfeld.
 1984, Freedom and Morality and Other Essays, Oxford: Clarendon Press.
 1984, More of My Life, London: Collins.
 1986, Ludwig Wittgenstein, London: Penguin.
 1986, Voltaire, New York: Random House.
 1988, Thomas Paine, London: Secker & Warburg. 
 1990, The Meaning of Life and Other Essays, Weidenfeld & Nicolson.
1991, "A Defense of Empiricism" in: Griffiths, A. Phillips (ed.), A. J. Ayer: Memorial Essays (Royal Institute of Philosophy Supplements). Cambridge University Press.
 1992, "Intellectual Autobiography" and Repiies in: Lewis Edwin Hahn (ed.), The Philosophy of A.J. Ayer (The Library of Living Philosophers Volume XXI), Open Court Publishing Co.
*For more complete publication details see "The Philosophical Works of A. J. Ayer" (1979) and "Bibliography of the writings of A.J. Ayer" (1992).

See also 
 A priori knowledge
 List of British philosophers

References

Footnotes

Works cited 
 Ayer, A.J. (1989). "That undiscovered country", New Humanist, Vol. 104 (1), May, pp. 10–13.
 Rogers, Ben (1999). A.J. Ayer: A Life. New York: Grove Press. . (Chapter one and a review by Hilary Spurling, The New York Times, 24 December 2000.)

Further reading 
Jim Holt, "Positive Thinking" (review of Karl Sigmund, Exact Thinking in Demented Times:  The Vienna Circle and the Epic Quest for the Foundations of Science, Basic Books, 449 pp.), The New York Review of Books, vol. LXIV, no. 20 (21 December 2017), pp. 74–76.
 Ted Honderich, Ayer's Philosophy and its Greatness.
 Anthony Quinton, Alfred Jules Ayer. Proceedings of the British Academy, 94 (1996), pp. 255–282.
 Graham Macdonald, Alfred Jules Ayer, Stanford Encyclopedia of Philosophy, 7 May 2005.

External links 

 "Logical Positivism" (video) Men of Ideas interview with Bryan Magee (1978)
"Frege, Russell, and Modern Logic" (video) The Great Philosophers interview with Bryan Magee (1987)
Ayer's Elizabeth Rathbone Lecture on Philosophy & Politics
 Ayer entry in the Stanford Encyclopedia of Philosophy
 A.J. Ayer: Out of time by Alex Callinicos
 
 
 Appearance on Desert Island Discs - 3 August 1984
 

1910 births
1989 deaths
20th-century atheists
20th-century British non-fiction writers
20th-century British philosophers
Academics of University College London
Alumni of Christ Church, Oxford
Analytic philosophers
Aristotelian philosophers
Atheism in the United Kingdom
Atheist philosophers
Bard College faculty
British Army personnel of World War II
British people of Dutch-Jewish descent
British people of Swiss descent
British secularists
British Special Operations Executive personnel
Critics of religions
Empiricists
English atheists
English humanists
English logicians
English people of Dutch-Jewish descent
English people of Swiss descent
English philosophers
Epistemologists
Fellows of Christ Church, Oxford
Fellows of the American Academy of Arts and Sciences
Fellows of the British Academy
Jewish atheists
Jewish humanists
Jewish philosophers
Knights Bachelor
Linguistic turn
Logical positivism
Logicians
Metaphysicians
Ontologists
People educated at Eton College
People from St John's Wood
Philosophers of culture
Philosophers of education
Philosophers of history
Philosophers of language
Philosophers of logic
Philosophers of mind
Philosophers of religion
Philosophers of science
Philosophers of technology
Philosophy writers
Political philosophers
Presidents of the Aristotelian Society
English social commentators
Social philosophers
Vienna Circle
Welsh Guards officers
Wykeham Professors of Logic